The Dobbin House Tavern, known also as Dobbin House, on 89 Steinwehr Avenue in Gettysburg, Pennsylvania is a tavern which is listed on the National Register of Historic Places.

It was established in 1776, making it the oldest standing structure in the town limits of Gettysburg. It was built to be a home for Reverend Alexander Dobbin and his family. The building may have been a first stop on the Underground Railroad north of the Mason–Dixon line, although this has not been substantiated. During and after the Battle of Gettysburg, the house served as a temporary field hospital.

During the latter half of the 20th century, the Dobbin House was home to a large Civil War diorama and a gift center catering to battlefield tourists.  It was listed on the National Register of Historic Places in 1973.

Today, the house is a popular tavern and restaurant.

References

External links
Dobbin House Tavern website

Houses on the National Register of Historic Places in Pennsylvania
Gettysburg, Pennsylvania
Taverns in Pennsylvania
1776 establishments in Pennsylvania
Houses on the Underground Railroad
Buildings and structures in Adams County, Pennsylvania
Houses completed in 1776
American Civil War hospitals
National Register of Historic Places in Adams County, Pennsylvania
Individually listed contributing properties to historic districts on the National Register in Pennsylvania
Underground Railroad in Pennsylvania